Olaf Knudsen (28 March 1911 – 17 November 1966) was a Norwegian sport wrestler.

He was born in Halden, and represented the club Halden AK. He competed at the 1936 Summer Olympics, where he placed sixth in Greco-Roman wrestling, the light heavyweight class.

References

External links
 

1911 births
1966 deaths
People from Halden
Olympic wrestlers of Norway
Wrestlers at the 1936 Summer Olympics
Norwegian male sport wrestlers
Place of death missing
Sportspeople from Viken (county)
20th-century Norwegian people